Gustavo Morales is a Nicaraguan former Olympic hammer thrower. He represented his country in the men's hammer throw at the 1968 Summer Olympics. His distance was a 45.76. At the 1971 Pan American Games, Morales threw 47.96 m in the hammer throw finishing eighth.

References

Living people
1946 births
Sportspeople from Managua
Nicaraguan hammer throwers
Olympic athletes of Nicaragua
Athletes (track and field) at the 1968 Summer Olympics
Pan American Games competitors for Nicaragua
Athletes (track and field) at the 1971 Pan American Games